Josy (Yossef) Eisenberg (12 December 1933 – 8 December 2017) was a French television producer and rabbi. A Hasidic Jew of Polish origin (his father Oscar (Ovadia) was a Polish-born rabbi), he produced an animated TV show, À bible ouverte, which has been running on France 2 since the early 1960s. He was also the co-scenarist of the movie The Adventures of Rabbi Jacob. and wrote a number of different books including Seven Lights: On the Major Jewish Festivals with Adin Steinsaltz and Job ou Dieu dans la tempête with Elie Wiesel.

Rabbi Eisenberg died on 8 December 2017 at 83 years old.

References

1933 births
2017 deaths
French Orthodox rabbis
French people of Polish-Jewish descent
French Ashkenazi Jews
French animators
French screenwriters
French animated film producers
Officers of the Ordre national du Mérite
20th-century French rabbis
21st-century French rabbis
People from Strasbourg